Shahid Qasem Soleimani Stadium may refer to the following stadiums in Iran named after assassinated Iranian military officer Qasem Soleimani:

 Shahid Qasem Soleimani Stadium (Sirjan), a stadium in Sirjan.
 Shahid Qasem Soleimani Stadium (Tabriz), a stadium in Tabriz.